The Robert Falla Memorial Award (sometimes referred to as the Falla Award) is granted by the Ornithological Society of New Zealand to people "who have made a significant contribution to both the Ornithological Society of New Zealand and to New Zealand ornithology".

It was set up in memory of Robert Falla after his death in 1979, using contributions from a public appeal. The first award was made in 1981, but for the first few years awards were made for the preceding year. In some years no award is made.

Recipients 

 1981: Ross McKenzie
 1982: Archie Blackburn
 1983: A.T. Edgar
 1984: R.B. Sibson
 1985: Maida Barlow
 1986: Peter Child (posthumous)
 1987: Peter Bull
 
 1989: Graham Turbott
 1990: Barrie Heather
 1992: Beth Brown
 1995: Paul Sagar
 1997: David Crockett
 1999: Hugh Robertson
 
 
 2011: Ralph Powlesland
 
 2014: Nick Allen
 
 2018: David Melville
 2019: Andrew Crossland

See also

 List of ornithology awards

References 

Ornithology awards
New Zealand awards
Science and technology in New Zealand